Members of the New South Wales Legislative Assembly who served in the 32nd  parliament held their seats from 1938 to 1941. They were elected at the 1938 state election, and at by-elections. The Speaker was Reginald Weaver.

See also
Third Stevens ministry
Mair ministry
Results of the 1938 New South Wales state election
Candidates of the 1938 New South Wales state election

References

Members of New South Wales parliaments by term
20th-century Australian politicians